This is a list of characters from the American animated television series Bob's Burgers.

Appearances

Belcher family
The Belcher family is a family who runs the family business called Bob's Burgers. Loren Bouchard described their ethnicity as follows:

The Belcher family consists of:

Bob Belcher

Robert "Bob" Belcher, Jr. (voiced by H. Jon Benjamin) is the main character of the series. He is the son of Robert Belcher, Sr. (nicknamed "Little Bob") and Lily Belcher, the husband of Linda, and the father of Tina, Gene, and Louise. He is a third-generation restaurateur and currently the proprietor of his eponymous burger restaurant (Bob's Burgers) in a shore town. The Season 5 episode "Father of the Bob", begins with a flashback set 30 years prior in which a young Bob states he is 14 years old, making him 44 until the episode "The Laser-inth", in which he turns 45 and then again in the episode "Are You There Bob? It's Me, Birthday", where he turns 46 years old. The episode also mentions that Bob's mother Lily died prior to the series' beginning. As revealed in "Bob Fires the Kids", his childhood has been described as "crappy," as his father discouraged play. However, in The Bob's Burgers Movie, he implies that he loved spending time with his mother as she would take him on long walks. Bob's mother went unnamed until the Season 13 episode "Show Mama From the Grave", where the Belchers go to visit her gravesite.

Bob has a tendency to entertain himself by having conversations with inanimate objects, mainly food, and then speak back as the inanimate object, usually in a high, squeaky voice. He also enjoys making puns, using this talent to name his burger specials (e.g. "If Looks Could Kale", "She's A Super Leek", "The Cauliflower's Cumin from Inside the House", etc.). While poor with business management, and cursed with an unlucky streak, his skills at burger cooking are excellent; he has even been referred to as a "beef artist" by Mr. Fischoeder. His primary business rival is Jimmy Pesto, who owns an Italian restaurant (Jimmy Pesto's Pizzeria) across the street from Bob's Burgers. In the episode "Moody Foodie", it's mentioned that his eyes are brown.

As shown in the flashback during "Father of the Bob", the Burger of the Day special stems from an incident in which he customized a burger by adding chives and sour cream to it, calling it "Baby You Can Chive My Car". He tried to serve it to one of Big Bob's regular customers who normally ordered a tuna melt, but Big Bob threw the burger away in front of the whole diner. Ten years later, still resentful over not being allowed to cook the way he wanted, Bob turned down Big Bob's offer of a partnership in the diner and opened his own restaurant.

Bob prides himself on giving the customer a quality meal and goes the extra mile to ensure that by choosing fresh ingredients he gets from the local farmer's markets and co-ops. His biggest accomplishment is the 'Meatsiah', a concoction that consists of a steak tartare center with a medium-well cooked burger surrounding it and a burger Wellington surrounding the burger. Bob is allergic to shellfish, particularly lobster, as it causes his face to swell any time he eats it. This is a problem, as the (nameless) seaside town where the Belchers live has an annual lobster festival (which Bob hates because it takes away from his business). Bob, along with Linda, enjoys drinking and many of the episode gags involve Bob or Linda getting drunk, usually from wine. Bob also has a tendency to take mind-altering substances such as crack in "Sheesh! Cab, Bob?", absinthe in "An Indecent Thanksgiving Proposal", pain relievers in "Housetrap", and his pain medication in "Burgerboss".

Bob is a tall, paunchy, and swarthy chef. He has male pattern baldness and a bushy mustache (which is what initially attracted his bride-to-be to him). He has olive skin, and feathered bangs swooping down on his forehead. He wears a pale-grey, short-sleeved t-shirt usually donned with a white apron with a breast pocket with a pen peeking out of it; dark-grey chefs pants; and black kitchen clogs with white socks shown on the top near where his pants end.

Linda Belcher
Linda "Lin" Belcher (née Genarro) (voiced by John Roberts) is the happy-go-lucky and supportive wife of Bob and the mother of Tina, Gene, and Louise. Before her marriage to Bob, she was engaged to Hugo, who is now a local health inspector ("Human Flesh"). In the season 5 episode "Eat, Spray, Linda" she turned 44 years old. She has also referred to herself as a "pre-middle-aged mother" ("Lindapendent Woman"). In early seasons, Linda wears her everyday outfit top with a button up while in newer seasons it is a v-neck instead.

Linda's attraction to Bob, whom she often refers to as "Bobby", is in part due to his passion for his work, and also due to his "Tom Selleckian" mustache. Linda remains a loyal and devoted wife despite their frequent financial problems, and never having had a honeymoon or a day off in 10 years ("Weekend at Mort's"). She has a preference for mustaches, and says Bob "made himself ugly" when he shaved it off ("Sheesh! Cab, Bob?"). Her passions include singing, dinner theater, porcelain baby figurines, Tom Selleck, nautically themed romance novels, and prenatal yoga. She handles the accounting for the restaurant, though her bookkeeping methods are overly complicated. She is fond of alcohol and is known to say that "Mommy doesn't get drunk; she just has fun."

Linda is extroverted, has a thick New Jersey accent,and is fond of tackling problems using unconventional methods, though her methods are frequently over-optimistic and things sometimes go awry. She often encourages her kids to engage in behavior that Bob finds annoying, and though she wants what's best for her kids, she tends to be scatterbrained. Bob has described her as a "pushover" because she allows people (particularly the kids) to take advantage of her. She has a contentious relationship with Louise and often misunderstands her, even once organizing a slumber party for Louise against her will. She is a talented lyricist, as shown in "Lil Hard Dad". She has a tendency to spontaneously burst into song, a trait she shares with her voice actor John Roberts. Many of the songs she is known for are improvised by Roberts, including her "Thanksgiving Song", "Dish-a-Dee-Doo" (a jazzy ditty sung while washing the dishes, as seen in "Mother Daughter Laser Razor"), and a hair-braiding ditty that references the late Harry Truman. Her songs are frequently remade and set to music for the episode's end credits.

In the newer seasons, Linda's mouth was drawn less tucked-in in the theme-music intro than the earlier seasons.

In the Season 12 episode "Sauce Side Story" Linda's maiden name is revealed to be Genarro and that she is of Italian descent.
She has a friend who's only mentioned but never seen or heard named Ginger.

Tina Belcher
Tina Ruth Belcher (voiced by Dan Mintz) is the eldest Belcher child. She is 13 years old. She generally speaks in a masculine tone, wears glasses, works part-time at the family restaurant, and is often the voice of reason among the Belcher children. However, it is made quite clear Tina's own characteristics rival those of her siblings. She is trying to come to grips with her entry into adulthood and claims to have a complicated relationship with zombies. She typically wears a sky-blue, short-sleeved t-shirt; a short, navy-blue pencil skirt; white tube socks with red stripes on the bottom; black sneakers with white tips; and a yellow barrette on the right side of her head, which she dons typically with her thick-framed, black-framed glasses to help her see better. Like the rest of her Italian-looking family, she has black hair and olive skin. She also wears her hair in a "bob cut" with loose curls at the ends. Despite seeming reticent and shy around her peers, Tina has an active social and romantic life. She has an on-again off-again relationship with Jimmy Jr., and has dated, kissed, or flirted with several other boys. She is obsessed with horses, boys (particularly Jimmy Jr.), and buttocks; in various episodes, she writes in her journal about touching people's butts, which, to her, is the height of sexual contact. According to her siblings, Tina has written erotic fanfiction of several television shows and movies and has moved on to "erotic friend fiction", in which she uses real-life people. She is a member of the Hormone-iums, a musical revue at Wagstaff that sings songs about puberty, and was formerly a member of the Thundergirls, a Girl Scout-like organization. Tina was aged 12 in early episodes and now 13 since the episode "Sheesh! Cab, Bob?". She is generally soft-spoken and reserved, often in contrast to her more strident siblings. In the show's early developmental stages, the eldest Belcher child was originally written as a boy, named Daniel Belcher, who was also voiced by Mintz, whose personality in the never-broadcast pilot is said to have been similar to that of Tina's. She is also shown to have difficulties with her schoolwork, although being a hard worker, as shown in "Can't Buy Me Math" when she is put into remedial math and "Bob and Deliver" when guidance counselor Mr. Frond refers to her as a "dum-dum".

Gene Belcher
Eugene "Gene" Belcher (voiced by Eugene Mirman) is the middle child and only son in the family, revealed to be 11 years old in season 3. Like Linda, he has an upbeat and enthusiastic attitude about almost everything; however, he closely resembles Bob and has inherited his lobster allergy. He often promotes the restaurant by wearing a burger costume, which he uses to run in a mascot race in the season 1 episode "Torpedo" and using a toy megaphone to hand out samples. In "It Snakes a Village", it is shown that he suffers from ophidiophobia. Gene has a variety of interests and hobbies, with his most well-known being food and music. Though he has no training, he occasionally demonstrates great skill in music and aspires to be a musician; he enjoys playing a Casio-type keyboard and makes fart sounds using it and creates an elaborate love duet in "Topsy" as well as a one-man show in "Work Hard or Die Trying, Girl." Despite this, Gene is not without his flaws, namely a tendency to be easily distracted, which the family refers to as "Gene-ing out" in "Best Burger", but he is loving and loyal toward his family. He is also unathletic, as seen in several episodes including "Synchronized Swimming", when he has trouble opening a door which Tina then opens with ease and "Spaghetti Western and Meatballs", when he runs away from a fight in fear. Gene has an occasional tendency towards making unintentionally sexual double entendres, which his father Bob corrects or tells him not to repeat., often admonishing the boy by simply saying, "Gene..." Like his father and mother, he has olive skin and dark black hair. He has his hair in a short "bowl cut" with long flips at each side of his head. He sports a pale-yellow, almost-beige, short-sleeved t-shirt; a pair of slightly lengthy, light-blue denim shorts; short white socks; and, like his older sister, white and red sneakers.

Louise Belcher

Louise Belcher (voiced by Kristen Schaal) is the youngest child of the Belcher family and is revealed to be 9 years old in season 1 and is still 9 by Christmas five seasons later. She typically wears a short-sleeved, olive-green dress slightly below the knees; black, mary-jane flats; and a hot pink beanie hat with rabbit ears on top of it. Like the rest of her Italian-looking family, she has black hair and olive skin. Her black hair peeks out from her large hat, slightly exposing the hair-ties holding up her pigtails; her yellow hair-ties in the front covered up by the long ends of her bunny hat along with the aglets of her hat. Like her mother and older sister, her hair has curls at the ends, specifically her pigtails have curls at the ends. In spite of being the youngest, she usually dominates her two older siblings by "wear[ing] down [their] self-esteem over a period of years." Precociously intelligent, manipulative, and aggressive (even towards adults), she is more than willing to exploit people if there is anything to be gained, and has a history of gaslighting her siblings, especially Tina. She has an offbeat and dark sense of humor and picks locks as a hobby. She tends to be very loud and often shouts at the top of her lungs to get her points across. Louise always wears her signature pink hat with bunny ears, regardless of the time of day or situation; to date, viewers have never seen her uncovered head. She claims that she has "a raging staph infection under here" in the episode "Synchronized Swimming" when they try to make her take it off. In "Ear-sy Rider," when a high-schooler stole her hat from her, her head was off-screen, then she wore a hoodie till she got it back. In The Bob's Burgers Movie, she believes that her hat makes her brave and that she got it to face preschool. However, this turns out to be untrue, as she got it after her first day of preschool and that Linda made it in honor of Bob’s mother Lily, who often wore a similar beanie; though Louise’s hat had bunny ears added due to Linda having extra fabric. Louise is not immune to breaking her tough character persona, however: she called Bob "daddy" until she was eight, felt guilty about almost electrocuting her sister to death, still believes in Santa Claus, has a disturbing crush on a boy-band member, becomes enamored with puppies, and proclaims she does love her family in the face of death at the end of season 4. Since she was a baby, Louise has always liked Bob more than Linda, opting to spend more time with him as she finds him much more interesting; it can generally be assumed that Louise and Bob have a very strong relationship, although she is the most prone amongst her siblings to mock him. In "Carpe Museum", Louise accidentally reveals her plan to take over the family restaurant when Bob retires, after renaming it to "Louise's Burgers."

Relatives of the Belcher family
 Gayle Genarro (voiced by Megan Mullally) – Linda's neurotic artist sister, the aunt of Tina, Gene and Louise and the sister-in-law of Bob. Bob dislikes her, much to Linda's consternation. She is desperately lonely and once fell in love with Bob because, Linda explains, she always wants what Linda has. However, men often take an interest in her, including Dr. Yap, Mort, Mr. Frond, and Mr. Fischoeder. She loves cats and may suffer from some form of factitious disorder, as she often fakes injuries.
 Al Genarro (voiced by Sam Seder) – Linda's father, father-in-law of Bob, and the maternal grandfather of Tina, Gene, and Louise. He rarely speaks, is hard of hearing, and wears a hearing aid. He accompanies Gloria everywhere. He has a fetish for women inflating balloons and then sitting on them until they pop.
 Gloria Genarro (née Rinaldi) (voiced by Renée Taylor) – Linda's mother, mother-in-law of Bob, and maternal grandmother of Tina, Gene, and Louise. Bob doesn't like her very much and he always tries to hide from her when she and Al come over to visit. She convinces her husband to move to a retirement community of swingers. Her recent appearances validate Bob's view of her as she is shown to be constantly demanding, thankless and immature.
 Robert "Big Bob" Belcher Sr. (voiced by H. Jon Benjamin in "Bob Fires the Kids," Bill Hader in "Father of the Bob", Eric Bauza in "Interview with a Pop-pop-pire") – Big Bob is Bob's widowed father, the father-in-law of Linda, and the paternal grandfather of Tina, Gene, and Louise. Like his son, Big Bob is a restaurateur who owns his own business called "Big Bob's Diner." He's shown to be a tough-loving father towards his own son, as shown in flashbacks. Since his pre-teens, Big Bob has been very controlling of Bob and has put him to work most of the time. He enjoys line-dancing which he practices at the gay bar next to his diner. He found life to be difficult since the death of his wife, Lily. In conversations with his son, he revealed that he proposed to Lily after a tree almost fell on them while they were camping.
 Lily Belcher – Bob's deceased mother, mother-in-law of Linda, paternal grandmother of Tina, Gene, and Louise. She went unnamed until the Season 13 episode "Show Mama From the Grave". Most information about her comes from flashbacks and memories: She and Big Bob once went camping and a tree almost fell on them, causing Big Bob to know he wanted to marry her. She and Bob would make gingerbread houses together, a fond memory Bob has of her. Big Bob also found life and running the restaurant to be difficult following her death. She appears fully on screen for the first time in the Bob's Burgers movie, where she is depicted wearing her favorite pink hat. Bob tells Louise that her own bunny ear hat reminds him of Lily.

Recurring characters

Regular customers at Bob's Burgers
Bob's Burgers features regular ups and downs in customer volume, but two loyal customers help keep the restaurant open.

 Theodore "Teddy" (voiced by Larry Murphy) – Teddy is a talkative, kind-hearted, burly contractor who is a loyal and regular customer of Bob's Burgers. Although he is now overweight and bald, Teddy was attractive, had long blonde hair, and was physically fit in his youth. He was attractive enough to be cast as a lifeguard in a 1980s exploitation movie The Deepening, filmed at Wonder Wharf. However, an incident during filming took such a psychological toll on him that he resorted to overeating and gained a substantial amount of weight. Teddy is extremely fond of the Belchers and wants to be a part of the family. He considers Bob to be his best friend while Bob likes and respects Teddy but also finds him to be deeply annoying much of the time. He seems to have assumed Bob's last name is “Burgers” or “Burger” due to the restaurant name. Teddy is divorced, lives alone and dates infrequently. He was once married to a woman named Denise who treated him poorly and cheated on him regularly (According to Teddy, he and Denise had a threesome with a man named Ray which consisted of him just watching Ray and Denise have sex). Denise was highly critical of Teddy and once told him his head looks like a butt which, he explained, is why he always wears a beanie. Their marriage ended when Denise left Teddy for a man who is interested in boats and owns a waterside bar called “The Schoon Hound” where she works as a waitress. In the episode “Thanks-Hoarding”, it is revealed that Teddy is a hoarder due to childhood trauma and develops intense body odor, which he calls “panic sweats” when he becomes anxious. Long-winded at times, Teddy frequently tells needlessly detailed stories about mundane situations that usually bore the listener. While he is known to eat nearly anything that is offered to him (on one occasion, he ate a piece of a sponge  handed to him and, according to Linda, a receipt), Bob's hamburgers seem to be among his favorite foods. In the episode "Friends with Burger-fits", Teddy learns that his daily consumption of Bob's burgers and French fries has caused him to develop extremely high cholesterol. Generally mild-mannered and affable, Teddy participates in on-going therapy sessions as he sometimes has angry, violent outbursts over minor incidents which he instantly regrets often causing him to burst into tears and apologize. In "Frigate Me Not" we discover that Teddy is a Navy veteran.
 Mort (voiced by Andy Kindler) – Mort is a mortician and the owner of the "It's Your Funeral" funeral home next to the restaurant and also a regular customer of Bob's Burgers. He is a little odd and has a stereotypically morbid sense of humor. Mort is single, wears an obvious toupee, and lives in a stylishly decorated apartment above his funeral home. He is good friends with Bob and Teddy and has cared for the Belcher children on occasion. He has also acted as the Belcher family driver when Tina crashed Bob's car. Mort has a generally good sense of humor about the macabre questions to which he is often subjected regarding his job. His name is Latin for "dead" or "death", a playful nod to the fact that he works in a funeral home. He hires a Borat impersonator for his mother's 86th birthday party to help catch a man who lied to multiple restaurants about hair in his food.

Pesto family
The following are members of the Pesto family:

 Jimmy Pesto Sr. (voiced by Jay Johnston in 2011-2021) – Jimmy Pesto Sr., real surname Poplopovich, is the owner of the Italian themed restaurant across the street called "Jimmy Pesto's Pizzeria", which is more popular than "Bob's Burgers". Although of eastern European descent he goes by the Italian-sounding name of Pesto, presumably to increase the appeal of his restaurant; he and his family members are invariably referred to by the Pesto last name. He is the father of Jimmy Pesto, Jr., Andy, and Ollie, and is Bob's archenemy. Their feud often seems to border on stalking each other and occasionally descends into violence. Their families actually get along well and apart from a few isolated incidents, neither of their businesses actually endanger the other. This is in part because Bob's burgers are genuinely better than the food Jimmy serves, which is often described as being of sub-par quality. In one episode where Jimmy tries to outdo Bob by serving burgers, he can be seen weeping in the middle of the night, knowing that the ruse won't last; in another episode, Jimmy competes in a burger cook-off against Bob and a celebrity chef and his "Oregano Burger" is poorly received. It is revealed in "The Belchies" that he and his children's mother are divorced; she has not yet been seen, and Jimmy moved into a pathetic bachelor-type apartment after the divorce was finalized. The series has strongly implied that he has no real friends, as Bob is enlisted to bring him pain medication by the assistant at the pizzeria because the assistant cannot think of anyone who likes Jimmy, and knows that while Bob (rightly) loathes Jimmy he is a good person who will help out an injured person when asked to. He has dark brown hair worn in a pompadour style.
 Jimmy Pesto Jr. (voiced by H. Jon Benjamin) – Almost always referred to as "Jimmy Jr", Jimmy Pesto, Jr. is the oldest son of Jimmy Pesto. Jimmy works as the busboy at Jimmy Pesto's Pizzeria. He is Tina's classmate, love interest, and on-again-off-again boyfriend. Tina has a crush on him and tries her best to get his attention (slow dancing with him, forcibly sharing a pasta strand with him, etc.). He is close friends with Zeke, who calls him "J Ju", has a lateral lisp, and loves dancing. He appears to be among the most popular students at Wagstaff Middle School, though many students turned against him in "The Millie-Churian Candidate" after Louise bungled his class president campaign. Jimmy Jr is also prone to envy; in "Stand By Gene" he resents Gene for becoming friends with Zeke, and in "Two for Tina" he feuds with Tina's love interest, Josh, despite their on-and-off relationship. Jimmy Jr has gone on dates with Tina, however, he forgets this from time to time. Louise calls him "braceface" in "The Belchies," implying he wears braces, but these are never seen, aside from in his fifth-grade school picture in "The Millie-Churian Candidate". He has dirty-blond hair, light skin, and a tall stature. Jimmy Jr typically wears a pale-yellow, short-sleeved shirt; a denim, blue, small, opened vest over his shirt; black-grey sweatpants; and short white sneakers. He also has his father's pompadour hairstyle, but Jimmy Jr. has dirty-blond hair.
 Andy and Ollie Pesto (voiced by Sarah Silverman and Laura Silverman) – Andy and Ollie Pesto are Jimmy Pesto, Sr.'s blond twin sons who are the younger brothers of Jimmy Pesto, Jr. They are very childish and care for each other a lot, experiencing extreme anxiety whenever they must be separated – at one point they imply that their backpacks will miss each other when separated and are nearly run over because they were trying to carry each other across the street. They are classmates and good friends with Louise despite the rivalry between their fathers (as well as Louise's tendency to take advantage of them, such as in "Art Crawl"). Ollie and Andy's intense fondness for each other mimics that of Walter and Perry from Loren Bouchard's previous animated television series Home Movies. The difference between them is that Andy wears a light-blue shirt and Ollie wears a neon-green shirt.

Wagstaff School

Wagstaff School staff
The following characters work at Wagstaff School:

 Mr. Frond (voiced by David Herman) – Phillip J. Frond is the "self-certified" school counselor of Wagstaff School. He feels underused and underappreciated at the school, since nobody really likes him, due to his uptight and strict personality, and his advice is never sought after. He occasionally concocts harebrained schemes to advance his own career, which usually backfire spectacularly. He was born in 1971, making him 47 years old as of the episode The Secret Ceramics Room of Secrets. Mr. Frond is a vegetarian and has a small tongue. He also knits religiously, talks to his mother on the phone every day, and has multiple cats.
 Coach Blevins (voiced by Larry Murphy) – Coach Blevins is the gym teacher and wrestling team's coach who wears shatterproof goggles. He is also the 4th-grade science teacher, where he teaches the class how to make a battery out of a penny and a potato, and has the class dissect bananas. He usually settles gym class disputes by having the students wrestle. He takes salsa dancing classes and briefly had his driver's license suspended, forcing him to go to traffic school.
 Principal Spoors − Principal Spoors is the principal at Wagstaff. His face has never been shown and he has made only one physical appearance on the show.   
 Mr. Ambrose (voiced by Billy Eichner) – Mr. Ambrose is the sarcastic and apathetic school librarian and the cheerleading coach who has a penchant for dramatism, sometimes coming to verbal blows with Mr. Frond. He also practices witchcraft. He is writing a prequel to Mrs. Doubtfire called "Mrs. Doubtwater."
 Mr. Branca (voiced by David Herman) – Mr. Branca is an immigrant janitor from an unknown country. Back in his country, he was its President before a coup d'état occurred. He is talented at ribbon dancing, has a keen sense for fashion (despite wearing the same custodian uniform everywhere), and considers Tina to be his best friend, frequently gossiping with her about the other students.
 Mr. Desanto (voiced by Nick Kroll) - Mr. Desanto is the school's debate coach and photography teacher. He used to be a private investigator.
 Mr. Grant (voiced by Will Forte) – Mr. Grant is the school A/V teacher and runs the school news program. He is known for his five W's of News: "Wow! Woohoo! Way hot! Weird! and What the --!" He also encourages Gene and Courtney to read the morning announcements to motivate the student body in the morning, since Ms. LaBonz puts them to sleep with her announcements.
 Ms. Jacobson (voiced by Melissa Bardin Galsky in 2012-2021, Ashley Nicole Black in 2021-Present) – Ms. Jacobson is the 8th-grade teacher who is usually seen teaching Tina's class which often includes Jimmy Jr., Jocelyn, Tammy Larsen, and Zeke. She is usually mild-mannered and is described by Bob as "ridiculously attractive" in "Two for Tina".
 Miss LaBonz (voiced by H. Jon Benjamin) – Miss LaBonz is a 4th-grade teacher who is usually teaching Louise's class which also includes Andy and Ollie Pesto, Millie Frock, Hogarth Haber, Harley, Jeremy, Regular-Sized Rudy, Chloe Barbash, and Wayne. She has a habit of stealing supplies from the school. She is also a heavy smoker, and she plays a game on her smartphone called Dippin' Chips. For all of her grating-voiced grumpiness, it's been shown that she is a good teacher who cares for her students, and Louise is surprised to learn that Miss LaBonz grades Louise's work toughly because the teacher knows Louise is a very smart kid but also lazy and stubborn about staying that way. After Louise indirectly gives her a great evaluation review, LaBonz gets a coveted parking spot right in front of the school.
 Miss Merkin (voiced by Brian Huskey) – Matilda Merkin is the longtime music teacher at Wagstaff. She is a very proficient musician, competent at multiple instruments including drums, ukulele, piano, and guitar. She is supportive of Gene's talent, defecting to his guerrilla Die Hard musical after being replaced in the school musical. In "Itty Bitty Ditty Committee," Gene enlists her to help him improve his musicianship, but he gives up forty-five seconds later, because of the commitment required. She has a sister named Sheila who is a stage actress.
 Miss Selbo (voiced by Sarah Baker) – Miss Selbo is the school receptionist. She gossips about the students constantly. She frequents the teacher's lounge after school and pretends she is a teacher, using Miss Jacobson's mug. She also has psychopathic tendencies, stalking her ex-boyfriend Martin for a year after their breakup, sleeping outside his house, urinating on his mail, and stealing his dog.
 Miss Schnur (voiced by Sarah Silverman) – Miss Schnur is the secretary to Principal Spoors who is usually distracted by kids who are sent to Spoors. She has a pet cat, is a fan of Penny Marshall, David Schwimmer, and Brendan Fraser, and is devoted to her nephew Nathan. She has trouble going #2 at school.
 Ms. Twitchell (voiced by Tymberlee Hill) – Ms. Twitchell is the 6th-grade teacher. She is divorced.

Wagstaff School students
The following students attend Wagstaff school with the Belcher siblings and the Pesto siblings:

 Alex Papasian (voiced by Thomas Middleditch in 2018–19, Paul Rust in 2011–present) - Alex Papasian is a Wagstaff School student and one of Gene's best friends. In "Cheer Up, Sleepy Gene" the pair bonded over their mutual dislike of gym class resulting in Alex inviting Gene to his first sleepover during which he attempts to run away from his parents. In "Roller? I Hardly Know Her!", more of his relationship with Gene is established including that they like to play RoboWizard Quest in the basement of the restaurant. This same episode also reveals that Alex is extremely sensitive to sesame.
 Chloe Barbash (voiced by Stephanie Beatriz) - Chloe Barbash is a student in Coach Blevins' science class with Louise. In "Bob Actually", it is revealed that Regular-Sized Rudy has an unrequited crush on her. She uses a very fragrant and pleasingly aromatic shampoo.
 Choo-Choo (voiced by Brian Posehn) – Choo-Choo is a student at Wagstaff School and Gene's nemesis. He constantly annoys Gene whenever he tells a joke by saying the punchline before him. He first appeared in "Spaghetti Western and Meatballs" and got his name for saying "choo choo" every time he got into a fight.
 Courtney Wheeler (voiced by David Wain) – Gene's on-and-off girlfriend; an annoying girl who likes Gene in the episode "The Unbearable Like-Likeness of Gene". Gene begins going out with her when he is stuck with answering if he "like-likes" her, so he pairs up with her temporarily. She has long, wavy-curly platinum-blond hair in two, thick pigtails and olive skin. Courtney usually wears a lavender-purple tank top; a short, violet-purple skirt; light-purple flat shoes, and a gold necklace whose heart-shaped pendant she likes to put in her mouth. Gene's plans were to break up with her until he meets her father Doug who he believes can launch his career in writing jingles. He breaks up with her at her birthday party after she interrupts one of his performances, and she retaliates by upstaging him by staging a musical based on the film Working Girl. In "The Gene & Courtney Show", they reconcile and kindle a romance, but Courtney eventually breaks up with Gene in order to preserve the quality of their show.
 Darryl (voiced by Aziz Ansari) – Darryl is a student at Wagstaff School who likes video and arcade games, comic books, robots, and going to the science museum. He is (possibly) of Indian-American descent and is a gifted math student, tutoring many of the Wagstaff students who are remedial. In the episode "Nude Beach", he teams up with the Belchers in their attempt to sell tickets to a view of the titular nude beach to children at their school. A talented musician, he is passionate about singing and is uses a looper pedal when he creates music. Darryl has arachnophobia, claustrophobia, and eczema. Darryl can't whistle and cries during the movie Frozen.
 Harley (voiced by Katie Crown in 2014-2021, Ashley Nicole Black in 2021-present) – Harley is a garrulous classmate of Louise and Regular-Sized Rudy. Extroverted and indefatigable, she is usually positive but can quickly become disheartened or frightened. She collects stickers, is in the Thunder Girls, has a wallet made of duct tape, and has an orange-and-yellow cat named Popover.
 Henry Haber (voiced by Jim Gaffigan) – Henry Haber is a student at Wagstaff School. He first appears in "Carpe Museum" where he is assigned as Tina's buddy for the museum field trip. In "The Millie-churian Candidate" Henry runs for student body president under the campaign "Chess we Can". He later wins by default after Millie and Louise both get disqualified. He is on the debate team (as seen in "Ain't Miss Debatin'") and briefly dates Tina. Henry has a younger brother, Hogarth, who is in Louise's class (as seen in "The Millie-churian Candidate"). He is mutually attracted to classmate Susmita.
 Jeremy (voiced by H. Jon Benjamin) – Jeremy is one of Louise's classmates. He was first characterized as uptight, ratting on Louise's science project to Mr. Frond in "Topsy", but as evidenced by his willingness to engage in bounce house theft in "House Of 1000 Bounces", he's loosened up a little. His favorite film is War Horse.
 Jocelyn (voiced by John Roberts) – Jocelyn is a student at Wagstaff School and Tammy's best friend and sidekick. She has blonde curly hair that she wears in a side ponytail and is a cheerleader as well. She displays an obsession with being cool and popular to the point of being unable to have a mind of her own to avoid embarrassing herself. She can often be heard saying things like "That's so cool. Unless you guys don't think so. Then it's lame."
 Jodi (voiced by Rachel Dratch) – Jodi is a student at Wagstaff School who has a severe fear of germs. It is extreme enough that she struggles to sit down or touch anything without using hand sanitizer or wearing rubber gloves. She is in the Thunder Girls. She has trouble with math and tries out for the girls' field hockey team.
 Large Tommy (voiced by H. Jon Benjamin) – Large Tommy is an overweight nerd-looking student who has brown hair and wears a red shirt and glasses. Like Speedo Guy, he appears randomly in the series, mainly in background roles. He is the slowest runner at Wagstaff.
 Lenny DeStefano (voiced by Larry Murphy) – Lenny is in the sixth grade with Gene. Lenny is an extremely popular and handsome boy, considered the biggest catch at Wagstaff among the girls of all grades. His charm apparently extends to adults, as Bob seemed very taken with Lenny during a short car ride together and Ms. Merkin even expressed interest in attending his birthday party. He was mentioned by Jimmy Junior when the latter asked Tina if she were seeing Lenny after she confessed to Jimmy Jr. that another boy asked her to his school dance (which turned out to be Josh) in "Tina for Two", with Jimmy mentioning Lenny's "good looks".
 Mabel "Abby" Haddington (voiced by Rachel Dratch) – Abby is a student who attends Wagstaff School. She is obsessed with braiding.
 Millie Frock (voiced by Molly Shannon) – Millie Frock is a student in 4th grade who is obsessed with Louise. She displays psychopathic tendencies; in "Fort Night", she traps the Belcher children and their friends in a fort overnight as retaliation for Louise refusing to be her friend. She runs for school president in "The Millie-Churian Candidate" with the intent of using her presidential power to force Louise to become her best friend. The two make a separate peace in "The Silence of the Louise".
 Peter Pescadero (voiced by H. Jon Benjamin) – Peter Pescadero is a wimpy boy who is one of Gene's classmates. He is a terrible dancer and owns a Sasquatch Mask that Gene borrowed as seen in "Beefsquatch." He has partial hearing loss (as mentioned in "The Unbearable Like-Likeness of Gene") and is also an award-winning magician (as seen in "Presto Tina-O"). In "Spaghetti Western and Meatballs", Louise alleges that he has a learning disorder. Peter plays the recorder and takes home economics with Tina, Jocelyn, Zeke, and Jimmy Junior.
 Regular-Sized Rudy (voiced by Brian Huskey) – Rudolph Steiblitz, known as Regular-Sized Rudy to distinguish him from a smaller classmate (Pocket-Sized Rudy), is Louise's classmate and best friend. He has asthma and needs to use his inhaler every two hours, and he is also allergic to chocolate. Despite his condition, he loves to have fun and often joins Louise in her mischievous escapades. He keeps cymbals in his backpack and is passionate about autumn foliage. He is a frequent guest on the wine tasting train ("The Kids Rob a Train") where he spends his time with Beans the bean bag chair while his father goes on internet dates. He is a hall monitor with Tina and looks up to her as an older role model. Rudy is the undefeated school Ga-Ga Ball champion until Gene upsets him.
 Susmita (voiced by Aparna Nancherla) - Susmita is one of Tina's classmates, and one of the best students in the class. She has a kind heart and is extremely generous. She is paired with Tina on a science project where they use a satellite dish to try to make contact with extraterrestrials. She also helps Tina avoid getting a D in their photography class.
 Tammy Larsen (voiced by Jenny Slate) is Tina's on-again, off-again antagonist. She was a brunette in her first appearance on the show (in the episode "Bad Tina"), but in subsequent episodes, her hair is dyed blonde. Andy and Ollie once described her as a "bathroom clown" due to her makeup. Tammy comes from a Jewish family and is at least twelve years old, as she has celebrated her bat mitzvah – or rather she tried to, as Tina wound up taking her place at the party, much to the relief of everyone, including Tammy's own relatives. She is also Wagstaff's head cheerleader and has a problem with passing gas, caused by laughing too hard, by someone lifting her up wrong, or because of nerves. The only time she can't pass gas is when she actually wants to.
 Wayne (voiced by Andy Richter) – Wayne is a classmate of Louise. He babysits the class pet chinchilla every weekend. He is fairly decent at Ga-Ga Ball, but he does not particularly enjoy playing it.
 Zeke (voiced by Bobby Tisdale) – Zeke is an immature but good-hearted and fun-loving boy with a Southern accent, who is best friends and often seen with Jimmy Junior. He gets along with everyone he meets and makes friends quickly, in contrast to most of the other child characters. Zeke's middle name is Anthony, and his last name is unknown. He's obsessed with wrestling and breasts and makes fart jokes often. He may be a gifted chef, as suspected by Bob in "Bob And Deliver". His biological parents divorced when he was a toddler. His blended family moves frequently, but he loves his stepmother Cheryl and is close to his older male cousin Leslie (voiced by Jack McBrayer). Zeke's grandfather, with whom he was also close, is deceased, having died from a stroke, but Zeke is also close to his grandmother, who lives in the Elegant Doily Retirement Home (his grandparents met as mascots in college). Zeke has a 44-year-old brother with whom he is not close. He has a casual crush on Tina.

Other children
The following are other children in the show that do not attend Wagstaff School:

 Bryce (voiced by Joe Lo Truglio) – Bryce is a teenage resident of King's Head Island who participates in the annual Hell Hunt on Halloween night as seen in "Full Bars." He appears again in "Speakeasy Rider" where he is an expert in Go-Karting racing under the name "Bryced Lightning." Bryce finished third in the King's Head Island Grand Prix.
 Duncan (voiced by Rhys Darby) - Duncan is a classmate of Sasha on King's Head Island, originally from New Zealand. He is friendly and naive, and he usually gets roped into Sasha's schemes ("Ain't Miss Debatin", "What about Blob?").
 Jonas (voiced by Paul Rust) – Jonas is the delivery boy at Reggie's Deli. He drives a moped and plays the melodica. Tina briefly finds him attractive, or more specifically, his long, blond hair. Jonas uses this knowledge to manipulate her into opening Bob's Burgers late at night while her parents are out of town so he and his friends can hang out and eat free burgers. He has a crush on a girl named Vanessa and tries to give her Louise's class's pet chinchilla as a gift to impress her.
 Logan Barry Bush (voiced by Kurt Braunohler) – Louise's nemesis and Cynthia's son. He first premiered in "Ear-sy Rider" as a bully to the Belcher kids, eventually stealing Louise's hat. He manages to keep it from her until the climax of the episode where Louise gets a biker gang to get it back. He later appears in the episode "Mother Daughter Laser Razor" attending the Mother-Daughter seminar where Dakota calls him a "male daughter." His middle name was chosen to make his full name a play on words based on the loganberry bush; his mother Cynthia admits "we didn't think it through." Bob employs Logan as an unpaid diner "intern" in exchange for a plot in the community garden, which is run by Cynthia ("Afternoon in the Garden of Bob andLouise") and dismisses Louise's anger over working alongside Logan because he values the plants he comes to call his "babies". When Logan and his awful mom push Louise to the breaking point and she steals Bob's plants to force him to deal with the situation, Bob realizes what an idiot he's been, apologizes to Louise, and accepts being ejected from the garden when he fires Logan from his internship.
 Sasha Whiteman (voiced by Jon Daly) – A resident of King's Head Island, appears in multiple episodes such as "Speakeasy Rider", where he is a member of the Kingshead Island Speeders. Sasha also appears in "Ain't Miss Debatin'" where he is the top debater for his school's team. In "House of 1000 Bounces" he helps Louise, Gene, Tina, and Regular-Sized Rudy steal his cousin Dahlia's bounce house. His last appearance is in "What About Blob," where Gene convinces his siblings and friends to save plankton at the yacht club.

Belcher Family friends
The following characters are friends of the Belcher Family or a friend of a particular member of the family:

 Josh (voiced by Ben Schwartz) – A boy that Tina met while in the milk fridge of the supermarket from "Lindapendent Woman." He returns in "Two for Tina" where both he and Jimmy Pesto Jr. both attempt to win over her heart and take her to the dance. He goes to a school for the performing arts and is a ballet dancer. He returns again in "Tappy Tappy Tappy Tap Tap Tap" where Tina attempts to let him know that she'd rather just be friends only for a stage accident during a tap dance dress rehearsal leads Tina to label the accident as a possible sabotage which she hopes will help her let him down easy.
 Gretchen (voiced by Larry Murphy) – Gretchen is a busty blond woman with a deep, nasal voice. She is a hairstylist, where Linda remains a loyal customer despite Gretchen's sub-par stylist abilities and tendency to cut Linda's ear at least once during every appointment, and also sells vibrators on the side. She gets a job working at an American Girl-style store and helps Louise steal a doll that she likes. Gretchen briefly dates Hugo in "Lobsterfest".
 Marshmallow (voiced by David Herman in 2011-2021) – A transgender African-American prostitute that first appeared in "Sheesh! Cab, Bob?" She is often seen in a white monokini, but not always. Her unique skill is being able to crack anyone's back. A running gag is that Bob often casually greets her with, "Oh, hey, Marshmallow." He describes her as someone who "comes and goes as she pleases, answers to no one, and is truly free."
 Mickey (voiced by Bill Hader in 2012-2020, Loren Bouchard in 2021, John Q. Kubin in The Bob's Burgers Movie) – A former bank robber who took a shine to the Belcher family. In contrast to stereotypes of criminals, he has an amiable demeanor. Mickey briefly works at Bob's Burgers in "Bob Fires the Kids". He later gets a job as a ride operator at Wonder Wharf. He also has a side hustle as a pedicab driver.
 Nat Kinkle (voiced by Jillian Bell) - Nat is a well-connected limo driver who first meets the Belchers in "V for Valentine-detta" where she helps the Belchers cheer up a heartbroken Tina. She drives a pink limousine with a distinctive musical car horn and wears a matching pink suit. She also helps the kids and Bob look for a missing ring in "The Ring (But Not Scary)" and takes the whole Belcher family on a road trip to visit her ex-girlfriend in "Just the Trip".
 One-Eyed Snakes – The One-Eyed Snakes are a biker gang who are good friends with the Belcher Family. The One-Eyed Snakes was founded by Horny Dave and led by him until his death when his motorcycle collided with a semi-trailer truck. There are a total of 18 members in the One-Eyed Snakes.
 Critter (voiced by Robert Ben Garant) – Critter is the leader of the One-Eyed Snakes following the death of Horny Dave. Afterward, he's seen as a friend of the Belchers, helping the kids build a go-kart from stolen motorcycle parts, sitting with Bob and Linda at the go-kart races, and calling on Bob for help getting out of jail. Bob bails him out of jail for $9,000 worth of unpaid parking tickets by selling a motorcycle to an investment banker, in order to get him to his first day of work at What the Tech before his afternoon shift starts.
 Mudflap (voiced by Wendi McLendon-Covey) – Mudflap is a female member of the One Eyed Snakes and Critter's wife. She gives birth to their son Sidecar in a booth in the restaurant. She throws a baby shower for her friend and fellow biker Goldie, who also delivers her baby in the restaurant.
 Rat Daddy (voiced by Kyle Kinane) - A bearded member of the One-Eyed Snakes.
 Ice Pick (voiced by Larry Murphy) - A member of the One-Eyed Snakes who sports a moustache, a goatee, and a mohawk.
 Scab (voiced by Jo Lo Truglio) - A member of the One-Eyed Snakes who has a goatee and no hair.

Health inspectors
The following are the health inspector for Bob's Burgers:

 Hugo Habercore (voiced by Sam Seder) – Hugo is a health inspector who used to be engaged to Linda but was jilted by her for Bob, a fact that causes him no end of frustration. This fact alone causes him to target Bob any chance he gets, to the point of malpractice as a health inspector, blackmail, and sabotage of his restaurant. He briefly becomes a nudist and he ropes the Belchers into his unauthorized sting of a meat vendor who sells horse meat.
 Ron (voiced by Ron Lynch) – Ron is Hugo's assistant, a trainee health inspector. Often quiet, he is willing to point out Hugo's malpractices when they go too far, and unlike Hugo he's friendly towards the Belchers. He takes a pedicab to the library on a weekly basis, and he volunteers at the local marionette theater.

Parents
The following are the parents of the various children who have appeared in the show:

 Colleen Caviello (voiced by Jaime Moyer) - Linda's rival on the PTA. Linda is obsessed with outdoing Colleen in that year's charity pasta dinner in "Spaghetti Western and Meatballs"; in "Thelma & Louise Except Thelma is Linda", Linda wrests the right to lead that year's bake sale from Colleen. Colleen also runs against Linda for PTA treasurer, but Joanne, the PTA president, convinces everyone to vote for Linda. Joanne goes on to manipulate Linda, and by extension, the PTA funds. Linda solicits Colleen's help due to her accounting experience in uncovering Joanne's ongoing fraud. It's not revealed who Colleen's child is.
 Cynthia Bush (voiced by Lindsey Stoddart) - The mother of Logan Barry Bush. She has as contentious a relationship with Linda as Logan does with Louise. Manages the community garden ("Late Afternoon in the Garden of Bob and Louise").
 Doug Wheeler (voiced by John Michael Higgins) - The father of Courtney. He writes jingles for a living. Doug composes Courtney's school musical based on the movie Working Girl. He is obsessed with roller dancing and forces his daughter into it in order to make up for his own shortcomings as a roller dancer in the 1980s. He is overprotective of his daughter, and also of his cat, Susan.

Business owners
The following are business owners in Ocean City:

 Calvin Fischoeder (voiced by Kevin Kline) – Mr. Fischoeder is an odd local landlord and businessman who dresses in a white suit, a white cape, and a white eyepatch over his left eye, and who has a hairstyle similar to Vanity Fair publisher Graydon Carter. He owns or has a stake in just about every property in town, including Wonder Wharf, the Belcher and Pesto restaurants, Family Fun Time, Reggie's Deli, Capoeira Center for Capoeira, Reflections, Spanks A Lot, and Mort's funeral home, It's Your Funeral. He drives around town in a golf cart and throws firecrackers at people. He likes Bob despite Bob always being late with his rent (partially because Bob knows a legendary burger recipe that he greatly enjoys and Bob reminds him of his father due to Bob's hairy arms). Louise describes him as being "one white cat away from being a supervillain". His last name is pronounced "Fish-odor." He smokes marijuana, as revealed in "Bob Fires The Kids." In "Ambergris", it is his revealed that his brother Felix is the reason why Calvin wears an eyepatch. Mr. Fischoeder claims to have "lost the year 1996 to schnapps" and has a gambling addiction, betting on everything from snail wrestling to the kids' underground casino to whether Bob or Jimmy would win in a fight.
 Edith and Harold Cranwinkle (voiced by Larry Murphy and Sam Seder) – The elderly owners of Reflections (an art sale, supplies, and lessons store). Edith is the chairperson of the Art Crawl, an event where local businesses display artwork. She frequently antagonizes Bob and enjoys making him pay huge markups when he desperately needs supplies in time critical situations, but she and Bob were able to get along better after Bob found out she was looked after by Wonder Wharf's circus freaks as a young girl while her parents worked on Wonder Wharf. Harold has acrophobia and once had a mild stroke. Edith is the dominant partner in both their business and marital relationship, which explains why Harold has reduced his nasty and insulting treatment of Bob since Edith warmed up a little bit to the burger maker.
 Felix Fischoeder (voiced by Zach Galifianakis) – Felix Fischoeder is the younger brother of Calvin Fischoeder. Felix is known to be rather neurotic and has emotional issues likely stemming from childhood. Felix is the cause of Calvin's poked out eye. Also to calm him down, they would have to sing a tribute song to Felix, revealing that he is a narcissist. He first appeared in "Ambergris" when he decided to install a new, high-tech bathroom in the restaurant. In the two-part episode "World Wharf II," he and Bob conspire to convince Calvin to destroy Wonder Wharf in order to put up a condominium and get a nightclub for his girlfriend Fanny. When Bob goes back on his deal to convince Calvin to sell Wonder Wharf, Felix ties them up under the pier with the intention of having them drown when the tide comes in. He soon regrets his actions and tries to save them despite Fanny's interference. Felix later returned in "Dawn of the Peck" where he conceived the idea of a Running of the Bulls style event called the "Turkey Trot" for the town's Thanksgiving festival, which turned out to be a disaster when the birds attacked the participants. Calvin later banishes Felix from his house, so Felix takes up residence in Calvin's treehouse.
 Jairo (voiced by Jon Glaser) – Jairo is a Brazilian capoeira instructor. He first appeared in "Sexy Dance Fighting" as an antagonist and returned in "Sexy Dance Healing" as an ally of Bob, healing his arm with a massage. He does not pay rent and has been serially evicted from numerous buildings. His carefree attitude borders on sociopathy, as seen when he dumps excess oil on the street with no thought for potential pedestrian slippage.
 Reggie (voiced by Eddie Pepitone) – The owner of Reggie's Deli. He appears to be a careless restaurateur, openly admitting to using stale bread. He owns a leaky gazebo and gets talked into selling essential oils by a younger woman he finds attractive. He has a heart attack in "Are You There Bob? It's Me, Birthday".

Media personnel
The following characters are people associated with the media:

 Chuck Charles (voiced by Thomas Lennon) – A daytime talk-show host along with his co-host and (secretly ex-) wife Pam until the Belchers' participation on his show caused their show to be cancelled. He then became the host of a game show called "Family Fracas". He and Pam hid their divorce for the sake of their talk show, but have an antagonistic relationship behind the scenes. Chuck blames the Belchers for his show being cancelled and harbors a grudge against them that has apparently yet to dissipate ("Best Burger").
 Pam (voiced by Samantha Bee) – A daytime talk-show host along with her co-host and (secretly) ex-husband, Chuck. The Belchers cause her show to be cancelled. Pam later gets a daytime court show called "Pam's Court" despite not being a real judge. Unlike Chuck, she does not harbor resentment toward the Belchers (likely because she doesn't have to put up with Chuck as much thanks to them). Despite initially keeping their divorce secret to the public, Pam harbors deep resentment toward Chuck. She claims that fame ruined their marriage. Pam is a binge drinker.
 Olsen Benner (voiced by Pamela Adlon in 2012-2021, Nicole Byer in The Bob's Burgers Movie) – A local news correspondent.

Other recurring characters
 Dr. Yap (voiced by Ken Jeong) The Belcher Family's dentist. He appears as a competent professional, but when the surface is scratched, he is fairly irresponsible and erratic. He is shown to be somewhat lonely and socially awkward, which leads him to inappropriate behavior with his patients and his fraternity brothers (he is a member of Beta Upsilon Pi). He is the subject of one of Tina Belcher's youthful crushes. Dr. Yap plays the guitar, keeping one in his dentist's office that he named Greta, and he loves skiing.
 Grover Fischoeder (voiced by David Wain) – Grover Fischoeder is the less-known, less-rich cousin of the Fischoeder brothers along with being their lawyer to cover his cousins' illegal activities, introduced on the ninth season. He serves as the antagonist of The Bob's Burgers Movie, having murdered a carnival worker six years prior to frame Mr. Fischoeder so he can get the Fischoeder inheritance and build a mega-park over Wonder Wharf. Grover's plan was thwarted by the Belcher family and he was arrested by the police.
 Gus (voiced by H. Jon Benjamin) – Gus is an elderly handyman who hangs out at the pier, the airstrip, and the go-kart track.
 Jen (voiced by Wendy Molyneux) – Jen is the babysitter for Gene and Louise when Tina is unavailable or when Tina isn't trusted to watch them. She is extremely ticklish and has a disfigured finger after getting it caught in a leaf blower. In "Uncle Teddy" Jen forgets that she has a prior babysitting engagement with the Belchers and goes to France instead.
 Kurt Enerny (voiced by Will Forte) – Also known as Up-skirt Kurt, he is a local pilot who teaches flying lessons with his 1968 Sweetnam Eagle seaplane, named Shoshana, and is infamous for seducing bored housewives who take lessons with him on a secluded island. In "Seaplane!", Linda takes lessons with him but rebuffs his advances. In "Live and Let Fly" he performs at the local air show with his sister Laverne with whom he has been in fierce competition since childhood as their father pitted them against each other to encourage their competitive spirit.
 Matthew Danko (voiced by David Herman) – He is the only park ranger for all of the parks in town. He hates doing paperwork. The kids convince him to join their puppet show at Rudy's birthday party.
 Mike Wobbles (voiced by Tim Meadows) – The reticent, reluctant, yet available mailman. One of his legs is shorter than the other. Despite walking over 9 miles a day, his calf muscles are unimpressive.
 Mr. Huggins (voiced by George Wallace) – Mr. Huggins first appears in the episode "As I Walk Through the Alley of the Shadow of Ramps" where he can be seen talking to the Belcher children about the racket Alice the truck driver was making. He later appears in "Lorenzo's Oil? No, Linda's", where he has Teddy and Bob help him move a new bed into his apartment as he prepares for a date.
 Officer Julia (voiced by Jerry Minor) – Officer Julia is a local police officer. She acts tough with people she arrests. She appears mostly with Officer Cliffany. From the beginning of the second season, she is written out of the storylines for unknown reasons, though she has made a few cameo appearances since then.
 Officer Cliffany (voiced by Sam Seder) – Officer Cliffany is a local tall, androgynous, and overweight police officer. She works frequently with Officer Julia whenever there is a case in town. Like Officer Julia, she was written out of the show after Season 1, though she has made some cameo appearances since then.
 The Prince of Persuasia (voiced by Rob Huebel) – The Prince of Persuasia (also known as The Deuce) is a "love guru," or more accurately a "pick-up artist" mentioned in the episode "Dr. Yap". Dr. Yap himself is a graduate of the prince's three-step program known as "The Persuasion Arts: The Ancient Art of Picking Up Women." Yap describes the prince to Bob saying: "He's a prophet, and for 3 payments of $900 he can be your best friend." In the subsequent episode "The Unnatural", it was revealed that he also operates several other instructional businesses, including baseball coaching, close-up magic, and inkjet printer repair. He uses a different alias/identity for each of these.
 Randy Watkins (voiced by Paul F. Tompkins) – Randy is a filmmaker who alternately appears as a friend or enemy of the Belchers. He has held various odd-jobs in his appearances. In "Sacred Cow," Randy is filming a documentary and makes Bob feel guilty about making burgers by putting a cow next to his restaurant and convincing people not to eat there. In "Food Truckin'," Randy buys and runs a food truck. In "Easy Commercial, Easy Gommercial," Randy helped the Belcher Family film their Super Bowl commercial. Bob and Linda allow him to shoot his one-man independent film in their restaurant after-hours ("Yes Without My Zeke").
 Sergeant Bosco (voiced by Gary Cole) – An authoritarian, no-nonsense police sergeant and Navy veteran. His last name is a reference to the movie Heat, where a detective played by Ted Levine bears the same last name. He first meets the Belchers during a hostage crisis at the bank across the street perpetrated by Mickey. He arrests Linda in "My Fuzzy Valentine" when she takes his gun in retaliation for his undermining her Speed Dating night. He later believes Linda to by psychic based on rumors spreading about town. His mother Lillian lives in the local retirement home and is the nemesis of Edith Cranwinkle. Sergeant Bosco has a brother who is clearly their mother's favorite.
 Speedo Guy (voiced by H. Jon Benjamin) – A unnamed blonde man in a pink speedo and rollerblades. He is an acquaintance of the Belchers and spends most of his time on Wonder Wharf. He is a vegan, although he visits the restaurant occasionally. He has a brief romance with a woman wearing a mermaid costume.
 Trev (voiced by David Herman) – Trev is a bartender at Jimmy Pesto's Pizzeria. He serves as Pesto's sycophant, often laughing excessively at his terrible jokes. He gets Teddy to build him an intricate dog house. He usually chortles when Jimmy is cruel to Bob but has indicated to Bob that he only does that because he needs Jimmy's approval to feel OK about himself.
 Yuli (voiced by Robert Smigel) – A security guard that works at Family Funtime in "Burger Boss" and "The Taking of Funtime One Two Three". In "Adventures in Chinchilla-sitting," Yuli was seen working at the roller rink indicating that he is a freelancer. In "Ex Mach Tina", he works as a nighttime security guard for Wagstaff. Yuli also works at OMG Mall in "Legends of The Mall."
 Mr. Dowling (voiced by Craig Anton) - The manager First Oceanside Savings Bank, a bank across the street from Bob's restaurant. He has an antagonistic relationship with Bob due to how much low finances his restaurant brings to the point where he has made it an inside joke around the bank. Whenever Bob comes to him for finance purposes, Dowling never skips an opportunity to mock Bob on account of his bad income.

References

Characters
Bob's Burgers
Bob's Burgers